Urs Eichhorn (born 17 May 1979) is a Swiss curler.

At the national level, he is a 2011 Swiss men's champion curler.

Teams

References

External links

Living people
1979 births
Swiss male curlers
Swiss curling champions
Universiade medalists in curling
Universiade silver medalists for Switzerland
Medalists at the 2003 Winter Universiade